Bradley Scott May (born November 29, 1971) is a Canadian former professional ice hockey player who played in the National Hockey League (NHL). In the 2006–07 season he won the Stanley Cup as a member of the Anaheim Ducks. He currently works as an NHL analyst with AT&T SportsNet Rocky Mountain. May was born in Toronto, Ontario, but grew up in Markham, Ontario.

Playing career
May was drafted by the Buffalo Sabres, 14th overall, in the 1990 NHL Entry Draft. While not a 
prolific scorer, May contributed to Sabres history in his second full season with the team. In Game 4 of the opening round of the 1993 Stanley Cup playoffs against the Boston Bruins, the teams were tied at 5 and required overtime to decide a winner. May took a pass from a falling Pat LaFontaine at center ice, deked past Ray Bourque, then went on goal where he faked out Andy Moog, which caused him to fall and leave an open space for May to score on a wrist shot. The goal not only won the game but secured Buffalo's upset of the second-best team in the NHL. The goal is referred to informally as the "Mayday goal", thanks to the following call from Sabres voice Rick Jeanneret:

May was later traded by the Sabres to the Vancouver Canucks for forward Geoff Sanderson on February 5, 1998.

After sitting out during the 2004–05 NHL lockout, May signed with the Colorado Avalanche as an unrestricted free agent for two years on August 20, 2005. May's signing caused much conjecture and debate in Colorado due to his role played in the previous season's Todd Bertuzzi and Steve Moore incident as a Vancouver Canuck. He was later traded on February 27, 2007 to the Anaheim Ducks for goaltender Michael Wall. The Ducks went on to win the Stanley Cup that year, and May had his name engraved on the Cup for the first time in his career.

On July 4, 2007, May re-signed as a free agent with Anaheim for another two years. In the 2007–08 season, May played his 900th career NHL game on November 16, 2007 and scoring his 125th career goal as the Ducks beat the Los Angeles Kings 6-3. May was selected during the year to ride on Anaheim city's float at the 2008 Tournament of Roses Parade to accompany and parade the Stanley Cup.

During the 2008–09 season on January 7, 2009, May was traded from the Ducks to the Toronto Maple Leafs in exchange for a conditional 6th round draft pick in 2010. On April 8, 2009 May played in his 1,000th career NHL game against the Buffalo Sabres. It was no coincidence that the milestone came against the Buffalo Sabres, as he was purposely sat out for the previous game.

On September 23, 2009, May was invited to try out for the Detroit Red Wings, reuniting temporarily with former Vancouver teammates Todd Bertuzzi and Dan Cloutier. May made his Red Wings debut in a pre-season game on September 25, 2009. At the start of the 2009–10 season on October 8, 2009, May then signed a one-year contract with the Red Wings. After posting 2 assists in 40 games with Red Wings May was put on waiver to clear roster room for Andreas Lilja on February 12, 2010. After clearing waivers and briefly contemplating possible retirement May decided to report to Wings AHL affiliate, the Grand Rapids Griffins, to play out the season. In an expanded role with the Griffins May scored 10 points in 17 games before he was returned to Detroit as a part of the extended squad for the playoffs.

Post-playing career and broadcasting
On September 20, 2010, without an offer of a new contract, May effectively announced his retirement in accepting a position as a CBC American Hockey League analyst.
Following the retirement of longtime Buffalo Sabres analyst Mike Robitaille after the 2013-14 season, May joined the Sabres broadcast crew on a limited basis before moving into Robitaille's slot in a full-time role for the NHL 2014-15 season. May was replaced on Sabres broadcasts by Martin Biron following the 2016-2017 season.
Beginning with the 2017-2018 season, May serves as an analyst for the Vegas Golden Knights with AT&T SportsNet Rocky Mountain.

Incidents

Phoenix Coyotes
As a member of the Phoenix Coyotes on November 11, 2000, May was suspended for 20 games for slashing Columbus Blue Jackets forward Steve Heinze in the nose with his stick. Heinze would need nine stitches, but returned to ice quickly. After the game, May apologized to Heinze, who accepted the apology. At the time, the 20-game suspension was the fourth longest in NHL history.

In 2002, May was arrested after assaulting a police officer and disorderly conduct at a nightclub in Scottsdale, Arizona. He was consequently sued by the police officer and in December 2005, was ordered to pay damages from a civil jury.

Steve Moore
May was also noted for allegedly putting the bounty on the head of the Colorado Avalanche's Steve Moore that ultimately resulted in the Todd Bertuzzi incident that essentially ended Moore's career. May was named in a lawsuit filed by Moore, but unable to prove if May did in fact put out a bounty on Moore, charges were later dropped in Colorado as the case was moved to a Canadian court.

Kim Johnsson
May was suspended for three games in the 2007 Stanley Cup Playoffs for punching Minnesota Wild defenceman Kim Johnsson in the face during the final minutes of Game Four between the Ducks and Wild. Both teams were involved in a large scrum of fighting, pushing, and shoving. May turned around and without warning punched Johnsson, who was skating towards the scrum. Johnsson was knocked unconscious for a short amount of time. Johnsson was not seriously injured, but was hospitalized, and missed Game Five of the series. The Ducks would win that game and eliminate the Wild from the Playoffs. In an interview, May said that he intended to contact Johnsson to apologize and explain what happened.

Career statistics

Regular season and playoffs

International

See also
List of NHL players with 1000 games played
List of NHL players with 2000 career penalty minutes

References

External links

1971 births
Living people
Anaheim Ducks players
Battle of the Blades participants
Buffalo Sabres announcers
Buffalo Sabres draft picks
Buffalo Sabres players
Canadian ice hockey left wingers
Colorado Avalanche players
Detroit Red Wings players
Grand Rapids Griffins players
Ice hockey people from Toronto
National Hockey League first-round draft picks
Niagara Falls Thunder players
Phoenix Coyotes players
Stanley Cup champions
Toronto Maple Leafs players
Vegas Golden Knights announcers
Vancouver Canucks players
Sportspeople from Markham, Ontario